2020 Filmfare OTT Awards, the first edition of OTT awards were held on 19 December 2020 in Mumbai and it included the films and web series released between August 1, 2019 and July 31 2020. These awards honour artistic and technical excellence in original programming on over-the-top streaming media in Hindi-language. Nominations were announced by Filmfare on 16 December 2020.

Winners and nominees

Popular awards

Critics' Choice Awards

Technical awards

See also
 Filmfare Awards
 2021 Filmfare OTT Awards

References

External links 
 
 Nominees for the Flyx Filmfare OTT Awards 2020

Award ceremonies in India
OTT, 2020
2020 television awards